Youssouf Abdi Ahmed (born 11 October 1997), is a Djiboutian professional football player who plays for the Djiboutian national team.

He debuted internationally on 4 September 2019 at the 2022 FIFA World Cup qualifying match against Eswatini in a 2-1 victory.

On 15 November 2021, Ahmed scored his first goals Djibouti against Niger at the 2022 FIFA World Cup qualifying match in a 7-2 defeat.

International goals

References

External links
 

Djiboutian footballers
1997 births
Living people
Association football midfielders
Djibouti international footballers